Witters v. Washington Department of Services for the Blind, 474 U.S. 481 (1986), is a decision by the Supreme Court of the United States in which the Court ruled that the Establishment Clause did not prevent the state of Washington from providing financial vocational assistance to a blind man who sought to study at a Christian college to become a pastor, missionary, or youth pastor. The Court ruled that the Establishment Clause does not prevent financial assistance from a state vocational rehabilitation program from being used for religious instruction.

Background
Larry Witters was eligible under Washington state law to receive financial assistance to pursue vocational instruction. At the time, he was attending a private Bible college with the intent to pursue a career as a pastor, missionary, or youth minister. The Commission for the Blind denied him aid on the basis that the Washington State Constitution barred state funds from being used to assist an individual in pursuit of a career or degree in theology. The Washington Supreme Court sustained the Commission's decision but used the US Constitution as the basis for its decision.

Decision
In a 9-0 holding, the Court ruled in favor of Witters. The Court reasoned that the test established in Lemon v. Kurtzman was applicable and that aid to Witters would meet the Lemon test. The Court found that there was a clear secular purpose to the law.  Also, the Court ruled that the primary effect of the statute was an effect on Witters, not religion.  Finally, the case was ruled to have no entanglement with religion since the decision as to where the aid money would be spent was made solely by the individual, not by any government agency so the Establishment Clause was not violated.

The case was remanded back to the state court. On  remand,  after  the  United  States Supreme  Court  reversed  the  Establishment  Clause  holding,  the Washington court held the program inconsistent with one of its Blaine Amendments, a decision the United States Supreme Court declined to review.

Counsel
Witters was represented by Michael P. Farris. Timothy R. Malone represented the respondent.

References

External links
 

United States Supreme Court cases
United States Supreme Court cases of the Burger Court
Establishment Clause case law
1986 in United States case law